The 2026 United States Senate elections are scheduled to be held on November 3, 2026, with 33 of the 100 seats in the Senate being contested in regular elections, the winners of which will serve six-year terms in the United States Congress from January 3, 2027, to January 3, 2033. Senators are divided into three groups, or classes, whose terms are staggered so that a different class is elected every two years. Class 2 senators were last elected in 2020, and will be up for election again in 2026.

As of January 2023, no Republican senators have announced plans for retirement; no Republican senators have announced plans to run for re-election; no Democratic senators have announced plans for retirement; and four Democratic senators are running for re-election.

Partisan composition 
All 33 Class 2 Senate seats are up for election in 2026; Class 2 currently consists of 20 Republicans and 13 Democrats.

Change in composition 
Each block represents one of the one hundred seats in the U.S. Senate.  "D#" is a Democratic senator, "I#" is an Independent senator, and "R#" is a Republican senator.  They are arranged so that the parties are separated and a majority is clear by crossing the middle.

Before the elections 
Each block indicates an incumbent senator's actions going into the election.

After the elections

Race summary

Elections leading to the next Congress 
In these general elections, the winners will be elected for the term beginning January 3, 2027.

Alabama 

One-term Republican Tommy Tuberville was elected in 2020 with 60.1% of the vote. He has filed paperwork to run for re-election.

Alaska 

Two-term Republican Dan Sullivan was re-elected in 2020 with 53.9% of the vote.

Arkansas 

Two-term Republican Tom Cotton was re-elected in 2020 with 66.5% of the vote. Democratic activist and candidate for U.S. Senate in 2020 and 2022, Dan Whitfield, has announced his campaign.

Colorado 

One-term Democrat John Hickenlooper was elected in 2020 with 53.5% of the vote.

Delaware 

Two-term Democrat Chris Coons was re-elected in 2020 with 59.4% of the vote.

Georgia 

One-term Democrat Jon Ossoff was elected in 2021 with 50.6% of the vote and is running for re-election to a second term. Georgia Governor Brian Kemp is considered a potential Republican candidate.

Idaho 

Three-term Republican Jim Risch was re-elected in 2020 with 62.6% of the vote.

Illinois 

Five-term Democrat and Senate Majority Whip Dick Durbin was re-elected in 2020 with 54.9% of the vote.

Iowa 

Two-term Republican Joni Ernst was re-elected in 2020 with 51.8% of the vote.

Kansas 

One-term Republican Roger Marshall was elected in 2020 with 53.2% of the vote. Democratic reverend, candidate for U.S. Senate in 2022 and Republican primary candidate for Kansas' 1st congressional district in 2020, Michael Soetaert, has announced his campaign.

Kentucky 

Seven-term Republican and Senate Minority Leader Mitch McConnell was re-elected in 2020 with 57.8% of the vote.

Louisiana 

Two-term Republican Bill Cassidy was re-elected in 2020 with 59.3% of the vote in the first round of the "Louisiana primary".

Maine 

Five-term Republican Susan Collins was re-elected in 2020 with 51.0% of the vote. She has not formally declared that she is running for a sixth term, but has filed paperwork to fundraise for a campaign.

Massachusetts 

Two-term Democrat Ed Markey was re-elected in 2020 with 66.2% of the vote and is running for re-election to a third full term.

Michigan 

Two-term Democrat Gary Peters was re-elected in 2020 with 49.9% of the vote.

Minnesota 

One-term Democrat Tina Smith was elected in 2020 with 48.7% of the vote after being appointed in 2018 then winning a special election the same year.

Mississippi 

One-term Republican Cindy Hyde-Smith was elected in 2020 with 54.1% of the vote after being appointed in 2018 then winning a special election the same year.

Montana 

Two-term Republican Steve Daines was re-elected in 2020 with 55.0% of the vote.

Nebraska 

Two-term Republican Ben Sasse resigned early in the 118th Congress to become president of the University of Florida. Former governor and 2006 Senate nominee Pete Ricketts was appointed as interim senator on January 12, 2023, by Governor Jim Pillen. A special election will take place in 2024, for the completion of the term.

New Hampshire 

Three-term Democrat Jeanne Shaheen was re-elected in 2020 with 56.6% of the vote and is running for re-election to a fourth term.

New Jersey 

Two-term Democrat Cory Booker was re-elected in 2020 with 57.2% of the vote and is running for re-election to a third full term.

New Mexico 

One-term Democrat Ben Ray Luján was elected in 2020 with 51.7% of the vote.

North Carolina 

Two-term Republican Thom Tillis was re-elected in 2020 with 48.7% of the vote. Republican daycare owner and candidate for U.S. Senate in 2022, Lichia Sibhatu, has filed to run.

Oklahoma 

Incumbent Republican Markwayne Mullin won a special election in 2022 with 61.8% of the vote to complete the remainder of the term vacated by Jim Inhofe, who resigned on January 3, 2023.

Oregon 

Three-term Democrat Jeff Merkley was re-elected in 2020 with 56.9% of the vote.

Rhode Island 

Five-term Democrat Jack Reed was re-elected in 2020 with 66.5% of the vote.

South Carolina

Four-term Republican Lindsey Graham was re-elected in 2020 with 54.4% of the vote. Democratic activist, author and candidate for U.S. Senate in 2022, Catherine Fleming Bruce, has filed to run.

South Dakota 

Two-term Republican Mike Rounds was re-elected in 2020 with 65.7% of the vote.

Tennessee 

One-term Republican Bill Hagerty was elected in 2020 with 62.2% of the vote.

Texas 

Four-term Republican John Cornyn was re-elected in 2020 with 53.5% of the vote. Republican U.S. representative Ronny Jackson has expressed interest in running.

Virginia 

Three-term Democrat Mark Warner was re-elected in 2020 with 56.0% of the vote.

West Virginia 

Two-term Republican Shelley Moore Capito was re-elected in 2020 with 70.3% of the vote.

Wyoming 

One-term Republican Cynthia Lummis was elected in 2020 with 72.9% of the vote.

See also 
 2026 United States elections

Notes

References